Amy Mulenga Holmes (born July 25, 1973) is a Zambian-born American journalist and political commentator. Holmes co-hosts, with fellow commentator Michael Gerson, a politically conservative-oriented talk show on PBS titled In Principle. She is a former contributor to NBC News.

Holmes formerly was a news anchor on Glenn Beck's TheBlaze TV and a former host of TheBlaze's news discussion program Real News. From 2015 to 2016, she hosted Way Too Early, which airs weekdays on MSNBC at 5:30 a.m. Eastern Time, as a lead-in to Morning Joe. She also has appeared as an independent political contributor for CNN and on Fox News, and has appeared on Real Time with Bill Maher numerous times.

Life and career
Holmes was born in Lusaka, Zambia, to a Zambian father and a white American mother. She was raised in her mother's native Seattle, Washington, after her parents divorced when she was three.

Holmes received a Bachelor of Arts with a major in economics from Princeton University in 1994. She was a member of Kappa Alpha Theta. She is a conservative independent.

She has guest co-hosted The View and co-hosted Fox News' Glenn Beck while Beck was on the road with his "Unelectable" show. She has also appeared on the HBO show Real Time with Bill Maher. She was an anchor of a morning radio program syndicated by The Washington Times newspaper called "America's Morning News". She has appeared with Cenk Uygur on MSNBC Live, and on Reliable Sources, Morning Joe, and Media Buzz.

After working for Independent Women's Forum, from 2003 to 2006, Holmes wrote Senate floor statements for Bill Frist, a two-term United States Senator from Tennessee and Republican Majority Leader.

Holmes resides in New York City.

See also
 Black conservatism in the United States

References

Further reading
 
 CNN Anchor profile (archived)

External links
 

1973 births
Living people
People from Lusaka
Journalists from Washington (state)
Television anchors from Seattle
American political commentators
American speechwriters
Black conservatism in the United States
CNN people
PBS people
Blaze Media people
Employees of the United States Senate
New York (state) Independents
Washington (state) Independents
Zambian emigrants to the United States
Zambian people of American descent
Zambian women journalists
American women journalists
American people of Zambian descent
American women television journalists
African-American women journalists
African-American journalists
Princeton University alumni
20th-century Zambian women
21st-century Zambian women
20th-century African-American people
21st-century African-American people
20th-century African-American women
21st-century African-American women